Bunny  is a 2005 Indian Telugu-language action film written and directed by V. V. Vinayak, with cinematography by Chota K. Naidu. The film was produced by Mallidi Satyanarayana Reddy. This film stars Allu Arjun and Gowri Munjal, while Prakash Raj and Mukesh Rishi play supporting roles with Sarath Kumar in a guest appearance. The music was composed by Devi Sri Prasad with editing done by Gautham Raju and cinematography by Chota K. Naidu. The film released on 6 April 2005 and was commercially successful.

Plot 
Somaraju is a leading businessman in Visakhapatnam. Mysamma is a close member of Somaraju who handles his deals in Hyderabad. Mahalakshmi is Somaraju's daughter, and he dearly loves her. Bunny alias Raja joins the same college as Mahalakshmi. He impresses her on the first day itself. Slowly, she falls in love with him. Somaraju, though reluctant initially, agrees to the marriage. Now, Raja has a condition that Somaraju should give his entire property to Raja as a dowry. The rest of the story explains why Raja asks for Somaraju's property.

Raja's birth father, Ranga Rao Bhupathi Raja, is Mahalakshmi's maternal uncle. Bhupathi Raja was a great man with much land and property, as well as much regard from the government and other people. When Mahalakshmi is born, her mother asks Bhupathi Raja to perform the baby naming ceremony and such. On Bhupathi Raja's way there, however, Somaraju attacks him with the help of a bunch of rowdies. They pretty much kill Bhupathi Raja and leave him to die in the forest. However, Bhupathi Raja manages to live and perform Mahalakshmi's ceremony, but he dies minutes after without telling anyone what happened.

Raja learns of this when his so-called father, Rangaswamy, explains to him that he is really his godfather and not his father. While trying to save him, his godfather and godmother give up their own son to keep him alive. To regain his rightful property, Raja fights Mysamma and wins his girl.

Cast 

 Allu Arjun as Raja alias Bunny
 Gowri Munjal as Mahalakshmi
 Prakash Raj as Somaraju
 Mukesh Rishi as Maisamma
 Raghu Babu as Suri, Somaraju's henchman
 Sharat Saxena as Rangaswamy, Raja's foster father
 Sudha as Raja's foster mother
 Seetha as Bunny's aunt
 Ahuti Prasad as DCP Venkhayya
 Rajan P. Dev as Chief Minister Gudumba Chatti
 Chalapathi Rao as Advocate Suryanarayana
 M.S. Narayana as Daiva Sahayam and Daiva Sahayam's father
 Venu Madhav as Daiva Sahayam's assistant
 Fish Venkat as Somaraju's henchman
 Jenny as Lecturer
 L. B. Sriram as Doctor
 Chitram Seenu as Bunny's friend
 Dil Ramesh as Somaraju's henchman
 Sravan as Tarun
 Sarath Kumar as Ranga Rao Bhupathi (guest appearance)

Production 
Bunny is Allu Arjun's third film as the lead actor after Gangotri (2003) and Arya (2004).

Music 

All music was scored by Devi Sri Prasad and released by Aditya Music.

Reception 
B Anuradha of Rediff.com criticized the plot for being a "age-old revenge drama" while praising Allu Arjun's performance. "Allu Arjun's effortless dancing and fights could be in vain, thanks to the boring theme," she added. A reviewer from Sify who rated 3/5 also echoed the same. "The story and presentation is old wine in a new bottle, but the performance of Allu Arjun, Praksh Raj and Raghu Babu saves the film to a very large extent," the reviewer stated.

Release 
Sagar was nominated for Filmfare Award for Best Male Playback Singer – Telugu at 53rd Filmfare Awards South.

References

External links 
 

2000s Telugu-language films
2005 action films
2005 films
Films directed by V. V. Vinayak
Films scored by Devi Sri Prasad
Films shot in Visakhapatnam
Indian action films
2000s masala films
Telugu films remade in other languages